Louis Francis Albert Victor Nicholas Mountbatten, 1st Earl Mountbatten of Burma (25 June 1900 – 27 August 1979) was a British naval officer, colonial administrator and close relative of the British royal family. Mountbatten, who was of German descent, was born in the United Kingdom to the prominent Battenberg family and was a maternal uncle of Prince Philip, Duke of Edinburgh, and a second cousin of King George VI. He joined the Royal Navy during the First World War and was appointed Supreme Allied Commander, South East Asia Command, in the Second World War. He later served as the last Viceroy of British India and briefly as the first Governor-General of the Dominion of India.

Mountbatten attended the Royal Naval College, Osborne, before entering the Royal Navy in 1916. He saw action during the closing phase of the First World War, and after the war briefly attended Christ's College, Cambridge. During the interwar period, Mountbatten continued to pursue his naval career, specialising in naval communications.

Following the outbreak of the Second World War, Mountbatten commanded the destroyer  and the 5th Destroyer Flotilla. He saw considerable action in Norway, in the English Channel, and in the Mediterranean. In August 1941, he received command of the aircraft carrier . He was appointed chief of Combined Operations and a member of the Chiefs of Staff Committee in early 1942, and organised the raids on St Nazaire and Dieppe. In August 1943, Mountbatten became Supreme Allied Commander South East Asia Command and oversaw the recapture of Burma and Singapore from the Japanese by the end of 1945. For his service during the war, Mountbatten was created viscount in 1946 and earl the following year.

In March 1947, Mountbatten was appointed Viceroy of India and oversaw the Partition of India into India and Pakistan. He then served as the first Governor-General of India until June 1948. In 1952, Mountbatten was appointed commander-in-chief of the British Mediterranean Fleet and NATO Commander Allied Forces Mediterranean. From 1955 to 1959, he was First Sea Lord, a position that had been held by his father, Prince Louis of Battenberg, some forty years earlier. Thereafter he served as chief of the Defence Staff until 1965, making him the longest-serving professional head of the British Armed Forces to date. During this period Mountbatten also served as chairman of the NATO Military Committee for a year.

In August 1979, Mountbatten was assassinated by a bomb planted aboard his fishing boat in Mullaghmore, County Sligo, Ireland, by members of the Provisional Irish Republican Army. He received a ceremonial funeral at Westminster Abbey and was buried in Romsey Abbey in Hampshire.

Early life 
Mountbatten, then named Prince Louis of Battenberg, was born on 25 June 1900 at Frogmore House in the Home Park, Windsor, Berkshire. He was the youngest child and the second son of Prince Louis of Battenberg and his wife Princess Victoria of Hesse and by Rhine. Mountbatten's maternal grandparents were Louis IV, Grand Duke of Hesse, and Princess Alice of the United Kingdom, who was a daughter of Queen Victoria and Prince Albert of Saxe-Coburg and Gotha. His paternal grandparents were Prince Alexander of Hesse and by Rhine and Julia, Princess of Battenberg. Mountbatten's paternal grandparents' marriage was morganatic because his grandmother was not of royal lineage; as a result, he and his father were styled "Serene Highness" rather than "Grand Ducal Highness", were not eligible to be titled Princes of Hesse, and were given the less exalted Battenberg title. Mountbatten's elder siblings were Princess Alice of Battenberg (later Princess Andrew of Greece and Denmark, mother of Prince Philip, Duke of Edinburgh), Princess Louise of Battenberg (later Queen Louise of Sweden), and Prince George of Battenberg (later George Mountbatten, 2nd Marquess of Milford Haven).

Mountbatten was baptised in the large drawing room of Frogmore House on 17 July 1900 by the Dean of Windsor, Philip Eliot. His godparents were Queen Victoria, Nicholas II of Russia (represented by the child's father) and Prince Francis Joseph of Battenberg (represented by Lord Edward Clinton). He wore the original 1841 royal christening gown at the ceremony.

Mountbatten's nickname among family and friends was "Dickie"; however "Richard" was not among his given names. This was because his great-grandmother, Queen Victoria, had suggested the nickname of "Nicky", but to avoid confusion with the many Nickys of the Russian Imperial Family ("Nicky" was particularly used to refer to Nicholas II, the last Tsar), "Nicky" was changed to "Dickie".

Mountbatten was educated at home for the first 10 years of his life; he was then sent to Lockers Park School in Hertfordshire and on to the Royal Naval College, Osborne, in May 1913.

Mountbatten's mother's younger sister was Russian Empress Alexandra Feodorovna. In childhood he visited the Imperial Court of Russia at St Petersburg and became intimate with the Russian Imperial Family, harbouring romantic feelings towards his maternal first cousin Grand Duchess Maria Nikolaevna, whose photograph he kept at his bedside for the rest of his life.

From 1914 to 1918, Britain and its allies were at war with the Central Powers, led by the German Empire. To appease British nationalist sentiment, King George V issued a royal proclamation changing the name of the British royal house from the German House of Saxe-Coburg and Gotha to the House of Windsor. The king's British relatives followed suit with Mountbatten's father dropping his German titles and name and adopting the surname Mountbatten, an anglicization of Battenberg. His father was subsequently created Marquess of Milford Haven.

Career

Early career 
Mountbatten was posted as midshipman to the battlecruiser  in July 1916 and, after seeing action in August 1916, transferred to the battleship  during the closing phases of the First World War. In June 1917, when the royal family stopped using their German names and titles and adopted the more British-sounding "Windsor", Mountbatten acquired the courtesy title appropriate to a younger son of a marquess, becoming known as Lord Louis Mountbatten (Lord Louis for short) until he was created a peer in his own right in 1946. He paid a visit of ten days to the Western Front, in July 1918.

While still an acting-sub-lieutenant, Mountbatten was appointed first lieutenant (second-in-command) of the P-class sloop HMS P. 31 on 13 October 1918 and was confirmed as a substantive sub-lieutenant on 15 January 1919. HMS P. 31 took part in the Peace River Pageant on 4 April 1919. Mountbatten attended Christ's College, Cambridge, for two terms, starting in October 1919, where he studied English literature (including John Milton and Lord Byron) in a programme designed to augment the education of junior officers which had been curtailed by the war. He was elected for a term to the Standing Committee of the Cambridge Union Society and was suspected of sympathy for the Labour Party, then emerging as a potential party of government for the first time.

Mountbatten was posted to the battlecruiser  in March 1920 and accompanied Edward, Prince of Wales, on a royal tour of Australia in her. He was promoted lieutenant on 15 April 1920. HMS Renown returned to Portsmouth on 11 October 1920. Early in 1921 Royal Navy personnel were used for civil defence duties as serious industrial unrest seemed imminent. Mountbatten had to command a platoon of stokers, many of whom had never handled a rifle before, in northern England. He transferred to the battlecruiser  in March 1921 and accompanied the Prince of Wales on a Royal tour of India and Japan. Edward and Mountbatten formed a close friendship during the trip. Mountbatten survived the deep defence cuts known as the Geddes Axe. Fifty-two percent of the officers of his year had had to leave the Royal Navy by the end of 1923; although he was highly regarded by his superiors, it was rumoured that wealthy and well-connected officers were more likely to be retained. Mountbatten was posted to the battleship  in the Mediterranean Fleet in January 1923.

Pursuing his interests in technological development and gadgetry, Mountbatten joined the Portsmouth Signals School in August 1924 and then went on briefly to study electronics at the Royal Naval College, Greenwich. Mountbatten became a Member of the Institution of Electrical Engineers (IEE), now the Institution of Engineering and Technology (IET). He was posted to the battleship  in the Reserve Fleet in 1926 and became Assistant Fleet Wireless and Signals Officer of the Mediterranean Fleet under the command of Admiral Sir Roger Keyes in January 1927. Promoted lieutenant-commander on 15 April 1928, Mountbatten returned to the Signals School in July 1929 as Senior Wireless Instructor. He was appointed Fleet Wireless Officer to the Mediterranean Fleet in August 1931 and, having been promoted commander on 31 December 1932, was posted to the battleship .

In 1934, Mountbatten was appointed to his first command – the destroyer . His ship was a new destroyer, which he was to sail to Singapore and exchange for an older ship, . He successfully brought Wishart back to port in Malta and then attended the funeral of King George V in January 1936. Mountbatten was appointed a personal naval aide-de-camp to King Edward VIII on 23 June 1936 and, having joined the Naval Air Division of the Admiralty in July 1936, he attended the coronation of King George VI and Queen Elizabeth in May 1937. Mountbatten was promoted captain on 30 June 1937 and was then given command of the destroyer  in June 1939.

Within the Admiralty, Mountbatten was called "The Master of Disaster" for his penchant of getting into messes.

Second World War 

When war broke out in September 1939, Mountbatten became Captain (D) (commander) of the 5th Destroyer Flotilla aboard HMS Kelly, which became famous for its exploits. In late 1939 he brought the Duke of Windsor back from exile in France and in early May 1940 Mountbatten led a British convoy in through the fog to evacuate the Allied forces participating in the Namsos Campaign during the Norwegian Campaign.

On the night of 9–10 May 1940, Kelly was torpedoed amidships by a German E-boat S 31 off the Dutch coast, and Mountbatten thereafter commanded the 5th Destroyer Flotilla from the destroyer . On 29 November 1940 the 5th Flotilla engaged three German destroyers off Lizard Point, Cornwall. Mountbatten turned to port to match a German course change. This was "a rather disastrous move as the directors swung off and lost target" and it resulted in Javelin being struck by two torpedoes. He rejoined Kelly in December 1940, by which time the torpedo damage had been repaired.

Kelly was sunk by German dive bombers on 23 May 1941 during the Battle of Crete; the incident serving as the basis for Noël Coward's film In Which We Serve. Coward was a personal friend of Mountbatten and copied some of his speeches into the film. Mountbatten was mentioned in despatches on 9 August 1940 and 21 March 1941 and awarded the Distinguished Service Order in January 1941.

In August 1941, Mountbatten was appointed captain of the aircraft carrier  which lay in Norfolk, Virginia, for repairs following action at Malta in January. During this period of relative inactivity, he paid a flying visit to Pearl Harbor, three months before the Japanese attack on it. Mountbatten, appalled at the US naval base's lack of preparedness, drawing on Japan's history of launching wars with surprise attacks as well as the successful British surprise attack at the Battle of Taranto which had effectively knocked Italy's fleet out of the war, and the sheer effectiveness of aircraft against warships, accurately predicted that the US would enter the war after a Japanese surprise attack on Pearl Harbor.

Mountbatten was a favourite of Winston Churchill. On 27 October 1941, Mountbatten replaced Admiral of the Fleet Sir Roger Keyes as Chief of Combined Operations Headquarters and was promoted to commodore.

His duties in this role included inventing new technical aids to assist with opposed landings. Noteworthy technical achievements of Mountbatten and his staff include the construction of "PLUTO", an underwater oil pipeline to Normandy, an artificial Mulberry harbour constructed of concrete caissons and sunken ships, and the development of tank-landing ships. Another project Mountbatten proposed to Churchill was Project Habakkuk. It was to be an unsinkable 600-metre aircraft carrier made from reinforced ice ("Pykrete"): Habakkuk was never carried out due to its enormous cost.

As commander of Combined Operations, Mountbatten and his staff planned the highly successful Bruneval raid, which gained important information and captured part of a German Würzburg radar installation and one of the machine's technicians on 27 February 1942. It was Mountbatten who recognised that surprise and speed were essential to capture the radar, and saw that an airborne assault was the only viable method.

On 18 March 1942, he was promoted to the acting rank of vice admiral and given the honorary ranks of lieutenant general and air marshal to have the authority to carry out his duties in Combined Operations; and, despite the misgivings of General Sir Alan Brooke, the Chief of the Imperial General Staff, Mountbatten was placed in the Chiefs of Staff Committee. He was in large part responsible for the planning and organisation of the St Nazaire Raid on 28 March, which put out of action one of the most heavily defended docks in Nazi-occupied France until well after the war's end, the ramifications of which contributed to allied supremacy in the Battle of the Atlantic. After these two successes came the Dieppe Raid of 19 August 1942. He was central in the planning and promotion of the raid on the port of Dieppe. The raid was a marked failure, with casualties of almost 60%, the great majority of them Canadians. Following the Dieppe Raid, Mountbatten became a controversial figure in Canada, with the Royal Canadian Legion distancing itself from him during his visits there during his later career. His relations with Canadian veterans, who blamed him for the losses, "remained frosty" after the war.

Mountbatten claimed that the lessons learned from the Dieppe Raid were necessary for planning the Normandy invasion on D-Day nearly two years later. However, military historians such as Major-General Julian Thompson, a former member of the Royal Marines, have written that these lessons should not have needed a debacle such as Dieppe to be recognised. Nevertheless, as a direct result of the failings of the Dieppe Raid, the British made several innovations, most notably Hobart's Funnies – specialised armoured vehicles which, in the course of the Normandy Landings, undoubtedly saved many lives on those three beachheads upon which Commonwealth soldiers were landing (Gold Beach, Juno Beach and Sword Beach).

In August 1943, Churchill appointed Mountbatten the Supreme Allied Commander South East Asia Command (SEAC) with promotion to acting full admiral. His less practical ideas were sidelined by an experienced planning staff led by Lieutenant-Colonel James Allason, though some, such as a proposal to launch an amphibious assault near Rangoon, got as far as Churchill before being quashed.

British interpreter Hugh Lunghi recounted an embarrassing episode during the Potsdam Conference when Mountbatten, desiring to receive an invitation to visit the Soviet Union, repeatedly attempted to impress Joseph Stalin with his former connections to the Russian imperial family. The attempt fell predictably flat, with Stalin dryly inquiring whether "it was some time ago that he had been there". Says Lunghi, "The meeting was embarrassing because Stalin was so unimpressed. He offered no invitation. Mountbatten left with his tail between his legs."

During his time as Supreme Allied Commander of the Southeast Asia Theatre, his command oversaw the recapture of Burma from the Japanese by General Sir William Slim. A personal high point was the receipt of the Japanese surrender in Singapore when British troops returned to the island to receive the formal surrender of Japanese forces in the region led by General Itagaki Seishiro on 12 September 1945, codenamed Operation Tiderace. South East Asia Command was disbanded in May 1946 and Mountbatten returned home with the substantive rank of rear-admiral. That year, he was made a Knight of the Garter and created Viscount Mountbatten of Burma, of Romsey in the County of Southampton, as a victory title for war service. He was then in 1947 further created Earl Mountbatten of Burma and Baron Romsey, of Romsey in the County of Southampton.

Following the war, Mountbatten was known to have largely shunned the Japanese for the rest of his life out of respect for his men killed during the war and, as per his will, Japan was not invited to send diplomatic representatives to his funeral in 1979, though he did meet Emperor Hirohito during his state visit to Britain in 1971, reportedly at the urging of the Queen.

Last Viceroy of India 

Mountbatten's experience in the region and in particular his perceived Labour sympathies at that time led to Clement Attlee advising King George VI to appoint him Viceroy of India on 20 February 1947 charged with overseeing the transition of British India to independence no later than 30 June 1948. Mountbatten's instructions were to avoid partition and preserve a united India as a result of the transfer of power but authorised him to adapt to a changing situation in order to get Britain out promptly with minimal reputational damage. Mountbatten arrived in India on 22 March 1947 by air, from London. In the evening, he was taken to his residence and, two days later, he took the Viceregal Oath. His arrival saw large-scale communal riots in Delhi, Bombay and Rawalpindi. Mountbatten concluded that the situation was too volatile to wait even a year before granting independence to India. Although his advisers favoured a gradual transfer of independence, Mountbatten decided the only way forward was a quick and orderly transfer of power before 1947 was out. In his view, any longer would mean civil war. Mountbatten also hurried so he could return to his senior technical Navy courses.

Mountbatten was fond of Congress leader Jawaharlal Nehru and his liberal outlook for the country. He felt differently about the Muslim League leader Muhammad Ali Jinnah, but was aware of his power, stating "If it could be said that any single man held the future of India in the palm of his hand in 1947, that man was Mohammad Ali Jinnah." During his meeting with Jinnah on 5 April 1947, Mountbatten tried to persuade him of a united India, citing the difficult task of dividing the mixed states of Punjab and Bengal, but the Muslim leader was unyielding in his goal of establishing a separate Muslim state called Pakistan.

Given the British government's recommendations to grant independence quickly, Mountbatten concluded that a united India was an unachievable goal and resigned himself to a plan for partition, creating the independent nations of India and Pakistan. Mountbatten set a date for the transfer of power from the British to the Indians, arguing that a fixed timeline would convince Indians of his and the British government's sincerity in working towards a swift and efficient independence, excluding all possibilities of stalling the process.

Among the Indian leaders, Mahatma Gandhi emphatically insisted on maintaining a united India and for a while successfully rallied people to this goal. During his meeting with Mountbatten, Gandhi asked Mountbatten to invite Jinnah to form a new central government, but Mountbatten never uttered a word of Gandhi's ideas to Jinnah. When Mountbatten's timeline offered the prospect of attaining independence soon, sentiments took a different turn. Given Mountbatten's determination, Nehru and Patel's inability to deal with the Muslim League and, lastly, Jinnah's obstinacy, all Indian party leaders (except Gandhi) acquiesced to Jinnah's plan to divide India, which in turn eased Mountbatten's task. Mountbatten also developed a strong relationship with the Indian princes, who ruled those portions of India not directly under British rule. His intervention was decisive in persuading the vast majority of them to see advantages in opting to join the Indian Union. On one hand, the integration of the princely states can be viewed as one of the positive aspects of his legacy. But on the other, the refusal of Hyderabad, Jammu and Kashmir, and Junagadh to join one of the dominions led to future wars between Pakistan and India.

Mountbatten brought forward the date of the partition from June 1948 to 15 August 1947. The uncertainty of the borders caused Muslims and Hindus to move into the direction where they felt they would get the majority. Hindus and Muslims were thoroughly terrified, and the Muslim movement from the East was balanced by the similar movement of Hindus from the West. A boundary committee chaired by Sir Cyril Radcliffe was charged with drawing boundaries for the new nations. With a mandate to leave as many Hindus and Sikhs in India and as many Muslims in Pakistan as possible, Radcliffe came up with a map that split the two countries along the Punjab and Bengal borders. This left 14 million people on the "wrong" side of the border, and very many of them fled to "safety" on the other side when the new lines were announced.

When India and Pakistan attained independence at midnight of 14–15 August 1947, Mountbatten was alone in his study at the Viceroy's house saying to himself just before the clock struck midnight that for still a few minutes, he was the most powerful man on Earth. At 11:58 PM, as a last act of showmanship, he created Joan Falkiner, the Australian wife of the Nawab of Palanpur, a highness, an act that was apparently one of his favourite duties that was annulled at the stroke of midnight.

Mountbatten remained in New Delhi for 10 months, serving as the first governor-general of an independent India until June 1948. On Mountbatten's advice, India took the issue of Kashmir to the newly formed United Nations in January 1948. This issue would become a lasting thorn in his legacy and one that is not resolved to this day. Accounts differ on the future which Mountbatten desired for Kashmir. Pakistani accounts suggest that Mountbatten favoured the accession of Kashmir to India, citing his close relationship to Nehru. Mountbatten's own account says that he simply wanted the maharaja, Hari Singh, to make up his mind. The viceroy made several attempts to mediate between the Congress leaders, Muhammad Ali Jinnah and Hari Singh on issues relating to the accession of Kashmir, though he was largely unsuccessful in resolving the conflict. After the tribal invasion of Kashmir, it was on his suggestion that India moved to secure the accession of Kashmir from Hari Singh before sending in military forces for his defence.

Notwithstanding the self-promotion of his own part in Indian independence – notably in the television series The Life and Times of Admiral of the Fleet Lord Mountbatten of Burma, produced by his son-in-law Lord Brabourne, and Freedom at Midnight by Dominique Lapierre and Larry Collins (of which he was the main quoted source) – his record is seen as very mixed. One common view is that he hastened the process of independence unduly and recklessly, foreseeing vast disruption and loss of life and not wanting this to occur on his watch, but thereby actually helping it to occur (albeit in an indirect manner), especially in Punjab and Bengal. John Kenneth Galbraith, the Canadian-American Harvard University economist, who advised governments of India during the 1950s and was an intimate of Nehru who served as the American ambassador from 1961 to 1963, was a particularly harsh critic of Mountbatten in this regard. However, another view is that the British were forced to expedite the partition process to avoid involvement in a potential civil war with law and order having already broken down and Britain with limited resources after the Second World War. According to historian Lawrence James, Mountbatten was left with no other option but to cut and run, with the alternative being involvement in a potential civil war that would be difficult to get out of.

The creation of Pakistan was never emotionally accepted by many British leaders, among them Mountbatten. Mountbatten clearly expressed his lack of support and faith in the Muslim League's idea of Pakistan. Jinnah refused Mountbatten's offer to serve as Governor-General of Pakistan. When Mountbatten was asked by Collins and Lapierre if he would have sabotaged the creation of Pakistan had he known that Jinnah was dying of tuberculosis, he replied, "Most probably". After his tenure as Governor-General concluded, Mountbatten continued to enjoy close relations with Nehru and the post-Independence Indian leadership, and was welcomed as a former governor-general of India on subsequent visits to the country, including during an official trip in March 1956. The Pakistani government, by contrast, never forgave Mountbatten for his perceived hostile attitude towards Pakistan and deemed him Persona non grata, barring him from transiting their airspace during the same visit.

Career after India 

After India, Mountbatten served as commander of the 1st Cruiser Squadron in the Mediterranean Fleet and, having been granted the substantive rank of vice-admiral on 22 June 1949, he became Second-in-Command of the Mediterranean Fleet in April 1950. He became Fourth Sea Lord at the Admiralty in June 1950. He then returned to the Mediterranean to serve as Commander-in-Chief, Mediterranean Fleet and NATO Commander Allied Forces Mediterranean from June 1952. He was promoted to the substantive rank of full admiral on 27 February 1953. In March 1953, he was appointed Personal Aide-de-Camp to the Queen.

Mountbatten served his final posting at the Admiralty as First Sea Lord and Chief of the Naval Staff from April 1955 to July 1959, the position which his father had held some forty years before. This was the first time in Royal Naval history that a father and son had both attained such high office. He was promoted to Admiral of the Fleet on 22 October 1956.

In the Suez Crisis of 1956, Mountbatten strongly advised his old friend Prime Minister Anthony Eden against the Conservative government's plans to seize the Suez canal in conjunction with France and Israel. He argued that such a move would destabilize the Middle East, undermine the authority of the United Nations, divide the Commonwealth and diminish Britain's global standing. His advice was not taken. Eden insisted that Mountbatten not resign. Instead, he worked hard to prepare the Royal Navy for war with characteristic professionalism and thoroughness.

Despite his military rank, Mountbatten was ignorant as to the physics involved in a nuclear explosion and had to be reassured that the fission reactions from the Bikini Atoll tests would not spread through the oceans and blow up the planet. As Mountbatten became more familiar with this new form of weaponry, he increasingly grew opposed to its use in combat yet at the same time he realised the potential for nuclear energy, especially with regard to submarines. Mountbatten expressed his feelings towards the use of nuclear weapons in combat in his article "A Military Commander Surveys The Nuclear Arms Race", which was published shortly after his death in International Security in the Winter of 1979–1980.

After leaving the Admiralty, Mountbatten took the position of Chief of the Defence Staff. He served in this post for six years during which he was able to consolidate the three service departments of the military branch into a single Ministry of Defence. Ian Jacob, co-author of the 1963 Report on the Central Organisation of Defence that served as the basis of these reforms, described Mountbatten as "universally mistrusted in spite of his great qualities". On their election in October 1964, the Wilson ministry had to decide whether to renew his appointment the following July. The Defence Secretary, Denis Healey, interviewed the forty most senior officials in the Ministry of Defence; only one, Sir Kenneth Strong, a personal friend of Mountbatten, recommended his reappointment. "When I told Dickie of my decision not to reappoint him," recalls Healey, "he slapped his thigh and roared with delight; but his eyes told a different story."

Mountbatten was appointed colonel of the Life Guards and Gold Stick in Waiting on 29 January 1965 and Life Colonel Commandant of the Royal Marines the same year. He was Governor of the Isle of Wight from 20 July 1965 and then the first Lord Lieutenant of the Isle of Wight from 1 April 1974.

Mountbatten was elected a Fellow of the Royal Society and had received an honorary doctorate from Heriot-Watt University in 1968.

In 1969, Mountbatten tried unsuccessfully to persuade his cousin, the Spanish pretender Infante Juan, Count of Barcelona, to ease the eventual accession of his son, Juan Carlos, to the Spanish throne by signing a declaration of abdication while in exile. The next year Mountbatten attended an official White House dinner during which he took the opportunity to have a 20-minute conversation with Richard Nixon and Secretary of State William P. Rogers, about which he later wrote, "I was able to talk to the President a bit about both Tino [Constantine II of Greece] and Juanito [Juan Carlos of Spain] to try and put over their respective points of view about Greece and Spain, and how I felt the US could help them." In January 1971, Nixon hosted Juan Carlos and his wife Sofia (sister of the exiled King Constantine) during a visit to Washington and later that year The Washington Post published an article alleging that Nixon's administration was seeking to persuade Franco to retire in favour of the young Bourbon prince.

From 1967 until 1978, Mountbatten was president of the United World Colleges Organisation, then represented by a single college: that of Atlantic College in South Wales. Mountbatten supported the United World Colleges and encouraged heads of state, politicians, and personalities throughout the world to share his interest. Under his presidency and personal involvement, the United World College of South East Asia was established in Singapore in 1971, followed by the United World College of the Pacific in Victoria, British Columbia, in 1974. In 1978, Mountbatten passed the presidency of the college to his great-nephew, the Prince of Wales.

Mountbatten also helped to launch the International Baccalaureate; in 1971 he presented the first IB diplomas in the Greek Theatre of the International School of Geneva, Switzerland.

In 1975 Mountbatten finally visited the Soviet Union, leading the delegation from UK as personal representative of Queen Elizabeth II at the celebrations to mark the 30th anniversary of Victory Day in Second World War in Moscow.

Alleged plots against Harold Wilson 

Peter Wright, in his 1987 book Spycatcher, claimed that in May 1968 Mountbatten attended a private meeting with press baron Cecil King and the government's Chief Scientific Adviser, Solly Zuckerman. Wright alleged that "up to thirty" MI5 officers had joined a secret campaign to undermine the crisis-stricken Labour government of Harold Wilson and that King was an MI5 agent. In the meeting, King allegedly urged Mountbatten to become the leader of a government of national salvation. Solly Zuckerman pointed out that it was "rank treachery" and the idea came to nothing because of Mountbatten's reluctance to act. In contrast, Andrew Lownie has suggested that it took the intervention of the Queen to dissuade Mountbatten from plotting against Wilson.

In 2006, the BBC documentary The Plot Against Harold Wilson alleged that there had been another plot involving Mountbatten to oust Wilson during his second term in office (1974–1976). The period was characterised by high inflation, increasing unemployment, and widespread industrial unrest. The alleged plot revolved around right-wing former military figures who were supposedly building private armies to counter the perceived threat from trade unions and the Soviet Union. They believed that the Labour Party was unable and unwilling to counter these developments and that Wilson was either a Soviet agent or at the very least a Communist sympathiser – claims Wilson strongly denied. The documentary makers alleged that a coup was planned to overthrow Wilson and replace him with Mountbatten using the private armies and sympathisers in the military and MI5.

The first official history of MI5, The Defence of the Realm (2009), implied that there was a plot against Wilson and that MI5 did have a file on him. Yet it also made clear that the plot was in no way official and that any activity centred on a small group of discontented officers. This much had already been confirmed by former cabinet secretary Lord Hunt, who concluded in a secret inquiry conducted in 1996 that "there is absolutely no doubt at all that a few, a very few, malcontents in MI5 ... a lot of them like Peter Wright who were right-wing, malicious and had serious personal grudges – gave vent to these and spread damaging malicious stories about that Labour government."

Personal life

Marriage 

Mountbatten was married on 18 July 1922 to Edwina Cynthia Annette Ashley, daughter of Wilfred William Ashley, later 1st Baron Mount Temple, himself a grandson of the 7th Earl of Shaftesbury. She was the favourite granddaughter of the Edwardian magnate Sir Ernest Cassel and the principal heir to his fortune. The couple spent heavily on households, luxuries, and entertainment. There followed a honeymoon tour of European royal courts and America which included a visit to Niagara Falls (because "all honeymooners went there"). During their honeymoon in California, the newlyweds starred in a silent home movie by Charlie Chaplin called Nice And Friendly, which was not shown in cinemas.

Mountbatten admitted: "Edwina and I spent all our married lives getting into other people's beds." He maintained an affair for several years with Yola Letellier, the wife of Henri Letellier, publisher of Le Journal and mayor of Deauville (1925–28). Yola Letellier's life story was the inspiration for Colette's novel Gigi.

After Edwina died in 1960, Mountbatten was involved in relationships with young women, according to his daughter Patricia, his secretary John Barratt, his valet Bill Evans, and William Stadiem, an employee of Madame Claude. He had a long-running affair with American actress Shirley MacLaine, whom he met in the 1960s.

Sexuality and child abuse allegations
Ron Perks, Mountbatten's driver in Malta in 1948, alleged that he used to visit the Red House, an upmarket gay brothel in Rabat used by naval officers. Andrew Lownie, a fellow of the Royal Historical Society, wrote that the United States Federal Bureau of Investigation (FBI) maintained files regarding Mountbatten's alleged homosexuality. Lownie also interviewed several young men who claimed to have been in a relationship with Mountbatten. John Barratt, Mountbatten's personal and private secretary for 20 years, has said Mountbatten was not a homosexual, and that it would have been impossible for such a fact to have been hidden from him.

In 2019, files became public showing that the FBI knew in the 1940s of allegations that Mountbatten was homosexual and a paedophile. The FBI file on Mountbatten, begun after he took on the role of Supreme Allied Commander in Southeast Asia in 1944, describes Mountbatten and his wife Edwina as "persons of extremely low morals", and contains a claim by American author Elizabeth, Baroness Decies, that Mountbatten was known to be a homosexual and had "a perversion for young boys". Norman Nield, Mountbatten's driver from 1942 to 1943, told the tabloid New Zealand Truth that he transported young boys aged 8 to 12 who had been procured for the Admiral to Mountbatten's official residence and was paid to keep quiet. Robin Bryans had also claimed to the Irish magazine Now that Mountbatten and Anthony Blunt, along with others, were part of a ring that engaged in homosexual orgies and procured boys in their first year at public schools such as the Portora Royal School in Enniskillen. Former residents of the Kincora Boys' Home in Belfast have asserted that they were trafficked to Mountbatten at Classiebawn Castle, his residence in Mullaghmore, County Sligo. These claims were dismissed by the Historical Institution Abuse (HIA) Inquiry. The HIA stated that the article making the original allegations "did not give any basis for the assertions that any of these people [Mountbatten and others] were connected with Kincora".

In October 2022 Arthur Smyth, a former resident of Kincora, waived his anonymity to make allegations of child abuse against Mountbatten. The allegations are part of a civil case against state authorities responsible for care of children in Kincora.

Daughter as heir 
Lord and Lady Mountbatten had two daughters: Patricia Knatchbull (14 February 1924 – 13 June 2017), sometime lady-in-waiting to Queen Elizabeth II, and Lady Pamela Hicks (born 19 April 1929), who accompanied them to India in 1947–1948 and was also sometime lady-in-waiting to the Queen.

Since Mountbatten had no sons when he was created Viscount Mountbatten of Burma, of Romsey in the County of Southampton on 27 August 1946 and then Earl Mountbatten of Burma and Baron Romsey, in the County of Southampton on 28 October 1947, the Letters Patent were drafted such that in the event he left no sons or issue in the male line, the titles could pass to his daughters, in order of seniority of birth.

Leisure interests 
Mountbatten was passionate about genealogy, an interest he shared with other European royalty and nobility; according to Ziegler, he spent a great deal of his leisure time in studying his links with European royal houses. From 1957 until his death, Lord Mountbatten was Patron of the Cambridge University Heraldic and Genealogical Society. He was equally passionate about orders, decorations and military ranks and uniforms, though he himself considered this interest to be a sign of vanity and constantly tried to distance himself from it, with limited success. Over the course of his career, he consistently attempted to secure as many orders and decorations as possible. Particular about details of dress, Mountbatten took an interest in fashion design, introducing trouser zips, a tail-coat with broad, high lapels and a "buttonless waistcoat" that could be pulled on over the head. In 1949, having by then relinquished the office of Governor-General of India but retaining a keen interest in Indian affairs, he designed new flags, insignia, and details of uniforms for the Indian Armed Forces ahead of the transition from British dominion to republic; many of his designs were implemented and remain in use.

Like many members of the royal family, Mountbatten was an aficionado of polo. He received US patent 1,993,334 in 1931 for a polo stick. Mountbatten introduced the sport to the Royal Navy in the 1920s and wrote a book on the subject. He also served as Commodore of Emsworth Sailing Club in Hampshire from 1931. He was a long-serving Patron of the Society for Nautical Research (1951–1979). Apart from official documents, Mountbatten was not much of a reader, though he liked P. G. Wodehouse's books. He enjoyed the cinema; his favourite stars were Fred Astaire, Rita Hayworth, Grace Kelly and Shirley MacLaine. In general, however, he had a limited interest in the arts.

Mentorship of King Charles III 
Mountbatten was a strong influence in the upbringing of his grand-nephew, King Charles III, and later as a mentor – "Honorary Grandfather" and "Honorary Grandson", they fondly called each other according to the Jonathan Dimbleby biography of the then-Prince – though according to both the Ziegler biography of Mountbatten and the Dimbleby biography of the Prince, the results may have been mixed. He from time to time strongly upbraided the Prince for showing tendencies towards the idle pleasure-seeking dilettantism of his predecessor as Prince of Wales, King Edward VIII, whom Mountbatten had known well in their youth. Yet he also encouraged the Prince to enjoy the bachelor life while he could, and then to marry a young and inexperienced girl so as to ensure a stable married life.

Mountbatten's qualification for offering advice to this particular heir to the throne was unique; it was he who had arranged the visit of King George VI and Queen Elizabeth to Dartmouth Royal Naval College on 22 July 1939, taking care to include the young Princesses Elizabeth and Margaret in the invitation, but assigning his nephew, Cadet Prince Philip of Greece, to keep them amused while their parents toured the facility. This was the first recorded meeting of Charles's future parents. But a few months later, Mountbatten's efforts nearly came to naught when he received a letter from his sister Alice in Athens informing him that Philip was visiting her and had agreed to repatriate permanently to Greece. Within days, Philip received a command from his cousin and sovereign, King George II of Greece, to resume his naval career in Britain which, though given without explanation, the young prince obeyed.

In 1974, Mountbatten began corresponding with Charles about a potential marriage to his granddaughter, Hon. Amanda Knatchbull. It was about this time he also recommended that the 25-year-old prince get on with "sowing some wild oats". Charles dutifully wrote to Amanda's mother (who was also his godmother), Lady Brabourne, about his interest. Her answer was supportive, but advised him that she thought her daughter still rather young to be courted.

In February 1975, Charles visited New Delhi to play polo and was shown around Rashtrapati Bhavan, the former Viceroy's House, by Mountbatten.

Four years later, Mountbatten secured an invitation for himself and Amanda to accompany Charles on his planned 1980 tour of India. Their fathers promptly objected. Prince Philip thought that the Indian public's reception would more likely reflect their response to the uncle than to the nephew. Lord Brabourne counselled that the intense scrutiny of the press would be more likely to drive Mountbatten's godson and granddaughter apart than together.

Charles was rescheduled to tour India alone, but Mountbatten did not live to the planned date of departure. When Charles finally did propose marriage to Amanda later in 1979, the circumstances were changed and she refused him.

Television appearances 
On 27 April 1977, shortly before his 77th birthday, Mountbatten became the first member of the Royal Family to appear on the TV guest show This Is Your Life. 	In the UK, 22.22 million people tuned in to watch the programme.

Assassination 

Mountbatten usually holidayed at his summer home, Classiebawn Castle, on the Mullaghmore Peninsula in County Sligo, in the north-west of Ireland. The village was only  from the border with County Fermanagh in Northern Ireland and near an area known to be used as a cross-border refuge by IRA members. In 1978, the IRA had allegedly attempted to shoot Mountbatten as he was aboard his boat, but poor weather had prevented the sniper taking his shot.

On 27 August 1979, Mountbatten went lobster-potting and tuna fishing in his  wooden boat, Shadow V, which had been moored in the harbour at Mullaghmore. IRA member Thomas McMahon had slipped onto the unguarded boat the previous night and attached a radio-controlled bomb weighing . When Mountbatten and his party had taken the boat just a few hundred yards from the shore, the bomb was detonated. The boat was destroyed by the force of the blast and Mountbatten's legs were almost blown off. Mountbatten, then aged 79, was pulled alive from the water by nearby fishermen, but died from his injuries before being brought to shore.

Also aboard the boat were his elder daughter Patricia, Lady Brabourne; her husband Lord Brabourne; their twin sons Nicholas and Timothy Knatchbull; Lord Brabourne's mother Doreen, Dowager Lady Brabourne; and Paul Maxwell, a young crew member from Enniskillen in County Fermanagh. Nicholas (aged 14) and Paul (aged 15) were killed by the blast and the others were seriously injured. Doreen, Dowager Lady Brabourne (aged 83), died from her injuries the following day.

The attack triggered outrage and condemnation around the world. The Queen received messages of condolence from leaders including US President Jimmy Carter and Pope John Paul II. Carter expressed his "profound sadness" at the death.

Prime Minister Margaret Thatcher said:His death leaves a gap that can never be filled. The British people give thanks for his life and grieve at his passing.

George Colley, the Tánaiste (Deputy head of government) of the Republic of Ireland, said:No effort will be spared to bring those responsible to justice. It is understood that subversives have claimed responsibility for the explosion. Assuming that police investigations substantiate the claim, I know that the Irish people will join me in condemning this heartless and terrible outrage.

The IRA issued a statement afterward, saying:The IRA claim responsibility for the execution of Lord Louis Mountbatten. This operation is one of the discriminate ways we can bring to the attention of the English people the continuing occupation of our country. ... The death of Mountbatten and the tributes paid to him will be seen in sharp contrast to the apathy of the British Government and the English people to the deaths of over three hundred British soldiers, and the deaths of Irish men, women, and children at the hands of their forces.

Six weeks later, Sinn Féin vice-president Gerry Adams said of Mountbatten's death:The IRA gave clear reasons for the execution. I think it is unfortunate that anyone has to be killed, but the furor created by Mountbatten's death showed up the hypocritical attitude of the media establishment. As a member of the House of Lords, Mountbatten was an emotional figure in both British and Irish politics. What the IRA did to him is what Mountbatten had been doing all his life to other people; and with his war record I don't think he could have objected to dying in what was clearly a war situation. He knew the danger involved in coming to this country. In my opinion, the IRA achieved its objective: people started paying attention to what was happening in Ireland.

In 2015, Adams said in an interview, "I stand over what I said then. I'm not one of those people that engages in revisionism. Thankfully the war is over."

On the day of the bombing, the IRA also ambushed and killed eighteen British soldiers at the gates of Narrow Water Castle, just outside Warrenpoint, in County Down in Northern Ireland, sixteen of them from the Parachute Regiment, in what became known as the Warrenpoint ambush. It was the deadliest attack on the British Army during the Troubles.

Funeral 

On 5 September 1979, Mountbatten received a ceremonial funeral at Westminster Abbey, which was attended by the Queen, the royal family, and members of the European royal houses. Watched by thousands of people, the funeral procession, which started at Wellington Barracks, included representatives of all three British Armed Services, and military contingents from Burma, India, the United States (represented by 70 sailors of the US Navy and 50 US Marines), France (represented by the French Navy) and Canada. His coffin was drawn on a gun carriage by 118 Royal Navy ratings. During the televised service, the Prince of Wales (later, King Charles III) read the lesson from Psalm 107. In an address, the Archbishop of Canterbury, Donald Coggan, highlighted his various achievements and his "lifelong devotion to the Royal Navy". After the public ceremonies, which he had planned himself, Mountbatten was buried in Romsey Abbey. As part of the funeral arrangements, his body had been embalmed by Desmond Henley.

Aftermath 
Two hours before the bomb detonated, Thomas McMahon had been arrested at a Garda checkpoint between Longford and Granard on suspicion of driving a stolen vehicle. He was tried for the assassinations in Ireland and convicted on 23 November 1979 based on forensic evidence supplied by James O'Donovan that showed flecks of paint from the boat and traces of nitroglycerine on his clothes. He was released in 1998 under the terms of the Good Friday Agreement.

On hearing of Mountbatten's death, the then Master of the Queen's Music, Malcolm Williamson, wrote the Lament in Memory of Lord Mountbatten of Burma for violin and string orchestra. The 11-minute work was given its first performance on 5 May 1980 by the Scottish Baroque Ensemble, conducted by Leonard Friedman.

On his death his estate was valued for probate purposes at £2,196,494.

Legacy 
Mountbatten's faults, according to his biographer Philip Ziegler, like everything else about him, "were on the grandest scale. His vanity though child-like, was monstrous, his ambition unbridled ... He sought to rewrite history with cavalier indifference to the facts to magnify his own achievements." However, Ziegler concludes that Mountbatten's virtues outweighed his defects:
He was generous and loyal ... He was warm-hearted, predisposed to like everyone he met, quick-tempered but never bearing grudges ... His tolerance was extraordinary; his readiness to respect and listen to the views of others was remarkable throughout his life.

Ziegler argues he was truly a great man, although not profound or original.
What he could do with superlative aplomb was to identify the object at which he was aiming, and force it through to its conclusion. A powerful, analytic mind of crystalline clarity, a superabundance of energy, great persuasive powers, endless resilience in the face of setback or disaster rendered him the most formidable of operators. He was infinitely resourceful, quick in his reactions, always ready to cut his losses and start again ... He was an executor of policy rather than an initiator; but whatever the policy, he espoused it with such energy and enthusiasm, made it so completely his own, that it became identified with him and, in the eyes of the outside world as well as his own, his creation.

Others were not so conflicted. Field Marshal Sir Gerald Templer, the former Chief of the Imperial General Staff, once told him, "You are so crooked, Dickie, that if you swallowed a nail, you would shit a corkscrew".

Mountbatten supported the burgeoning nationalist movements which grew up in the shadow of Japanese occupation. His priority was to maintain practical, stable government, but driving him was an idealism in which he believed every people should be allowed to control their own destiny. Critics said he was too ready to overlook their faults, and especially their subordination to communist control. Ziegler says that in Malaya, where the main resistance to the Japanese came from Chinese who were under considerable communist influence, "Mountbatten proved to have been naïve in his assessment. ... He erred, however, not because he was 'soft on Communism' ... but from an over-readiness to assume the best of those with whom he had dealings." Furthermore, Ziegler argues, he was following a practical policy based on the assumption that it would take a long and bloody struggle to drive the Japanese out, and he needed the support of all the anti-Japanese elements, most of which were either nationalists or communists.

Mountbatten took pride in enhancing intercultural understanding and in 1984, with his elder daughter as the patron, the Mountbatten Institute was developed to allow young adults the opportunity to enhance their intercultural appreciation and experience by spending time abroad. The IET annually awards the Mountbatten Medal for an outstanding contribution, or contributions over a period, to the promotion of electronics or information technology and their application.

Canada's capital city of Ottawa named Mountbatten Avenue in his memory. The Mountbatten estate in Singapore and Mountbatten MRT station were named after him.

Mountbatten's personal papers (containing approximately 250,000 papers and 50,000 photographs) are preserved in the University of Southampton Library.

Awards and decorations

He was appointed personal aide-de-camp by Edward VIII, George VI and Elizabeth II, and therefore bore the unusual distinction of being allowed to wear three royal cyphers on his epaulettes.

Arms

Notes

References

Footnotes

Works cited

 
 
 
 
 
 
 
 
 
 
 
 
 
 
 
 
 
 
 
 
 
 
 
 
 
 
 
 
 
 
 
  published in

Further reading

External links 

 Tribute & Memorial Website to Louis, 1st Earl Mountbatten of Burma
 70th Anniversary of Indian Independence – Mountbatten: The Last Viceroy – UK Parliament Living Heritage
 
 Papers of Louis, Earl Mountbatten of Burma
 

1900 births
1979 deaths
1940s in British India
1979 murders in the Republic of Ireland
Alumni of Christ's College, Cambridge
Assassinated British politicians
Assassinated military personnel
Assassinated royalty
Louis Francis
British Empire in World War II
British people murdered abroad
British terrorism victims
Burma in World War II
Chief Commanders of the Legion of Merit
Chiefs of the Defence Staff (United Kingdom)
Companions of the Distinguished Service Order
Deaths by improvised explosive device in the Republic of Ireland
Earls Mountbatten of Burma
English people of German descent
Fellows of the Royal Society (Statute 12)
First Sea Lords and Chiefs of the Naval Staff
Foreign recipients of the Distinguished Service Medal (United States)
German princes
Governors-General of India
Graduates of the Royal Naval College, Greenwich
Grand Croix of the Légion d'honneur
Grand Crosses of the Order of Aviz
Grand Crosses of the Order of George I
Grand Crosses of the Order of the Crown (Romania)
Grand Crosses of the Order of the Dannebrog
Grand Crosses of the Order of the Star of Romania
Improvised explosive device bombings in the Republic of Ireland
Knights Grand Commander of the Order of the Indian Empire
Knights Grand Commander of the Order of the Star of India
Knights Grand Cross of the Order of the Bath
Knights Grand Cross of the Order of Isabella the Catholic
Knights Grand Cross of the Royal Victorian Order
Knights of Justice of the Order of St John
Knights of the Garter
Legion of Frontiersmen members
Lord Lieutenants of the Isle of Wight
Male murder victims
Members of the Order of Merit
Members of the Privy Council of the United Kingdom
Military of Singapore under British rule
Louis
NATO military personnel
Partition of India
People associated with the Royal National College for the Blind
People educated at Lockers Park School
People educated at the Royal Naval College, Osborne
People from Windsor, Berkshire
People killed by the Provisional Irish Republican Army
People murdered in the Republic of Ireland
Presidents of the British Computer Society
Recipients of the Croix de Guerre (France)
Recipients of the Order of Polonia Restituta
Recipients of the Order of the Star of Nepal
Recipients of the War Cross (Greece)
Royal Navy admirals of the fleet
Royal Navy admirals of World War II
Royal Navy officers of World War I
Ship bombings
Terrorism deaths in the Republic of Ireland
Terrorist incidents in Europe in 1979
Terrorist incidents in the Republic of Ireland in the 1970s
Viceroys of India
Younger sons of marquesses
Viscounts created by George VI
Earls created by George VI
Recipients of the Distinguished Service Medal (US Army)
Burials at Romsey Abbey
Lords of the Admiralty
Military personnel from Berkshire
Recipients of orders, decorations, and medals of Ethiopia